Sympistis shait is a moth of the family Noctuidae first described by James T. Troubridge in 2008. It is found in New Mexico.

The wingspan is about 30 mm.

References

shait
Moths described in 2008